Bugok-dong is neighbourhood of Uiwang, Gyeonggi Province, South Korea.

Education

Elementary School 
 Uiwang Bugok Elementary School
 Deokseong Elementary School

Middle School 
 Uiwang Bugok Middle School

High School 
 Uiwang High School

Universities 
 Korea National University of Transportation (Uiwang campus)

Transportation

Subway 
 Seoul Subway Line 1 - Uiwang Station

External links
 부곡동 주민센터 

 

Neighbourhoods in Uiwang